Minel Šabotić (born 20 January 1994) is a Montenegrin footballer who plays as a defender.

Club career
Born in Montenegro (by then part of FR Yugoslavia), Šabotić was a youth product of Italian club Sassuolo, based in Sassuolo, in the Province of Modena. The stadium of the first team was located in Mapei Stadium – Città del Tricolore, Reggio Emilia.

In 2011–12 and 2012–13 season Šabotić was a player of Rolo, in Eccellenza Emilia–Romagna (Italian regional football league). In 2013, he was signed by Serie D club Correggese, also located within the Province of Reggio Emilia.

On 30 July 2014 he was signed by Lega Pro club Reggiana in a 3-year contract. Sabotić made 29 league appearances for the Reggio Emilia-based club.

On 8 October 2015 Šabotić signed a new 3-year contract, along with his defensive teammate Alessandro Spanò.

On 2 August 2019, he signed a 2-year contract with Carpi.

On 16 August 2021, he signed a one-year deal with Pistoiese in Serie C. On 28 January 2022, he moved to Carrarese.

References

External links
 

1994 births
Living people
Montenegrin footballers
Association football defenders
Serie C players
Serie D players
U.S. Sassuolo Calcio players
S.S.D. Correggese Calcio 1948 players
A.C. Reggiana 1919 players
Pisa S.C. players
U.C. AlbinoLeffe players
A.C. Carpi players
U.S. Pistoiese 1921 players
Carrarese Calcio players
Montenegrin expatriate footballers
Expatriate footballers in Italy
Montenegrin expatriate sportspeople in Italy